"L'important c'est la rose" is a song written by Louis Amade and Gilbert Bécaud. Gilbert Bécaud recorded a version, which was released in 1967.

Other recordings

 1967 : Tino Rossi (Columbia ESVF 1082)
 1967 : Grethe & Jørgen Ingmann in Danish as gi' mig en rose
 1967 : Östen Warnerbring in Swedish as Glöm ej bort det finns rosor
 1967 : Amália Rodrigues (Columbia ESRF 1872)
 1967 : Riccardo del Turco in Italian as L'importante è la rosa
 1967 : Helena Vondráčková in Czech as Ruže kvetou dál
 1968 : Gilbert Bécaud & Françoise Hardy duet as L'important c'est la rose for the Movie Monte Carlo: C'est La Rose
 1969 : Gilbert Bécaud in Spanish as Lo importante es la rosa
 1975 : Gilbert Bécaud in English as The Importance of Your Love
 1977 : BZN in French
 1976 : Jane Olivor in English and French as L’important c’est la rose
 1978 : Hildegard Knef in German as Überall blühen Rosen
 1989 : Philippine Madrigal Singers in English
 2010 : Vicky Leandros in German as Doch ich seh all die Rosen
 2016 : Raquel Bitton English version

The Östen Warnerbring recording charted at Svensktoppen for eight weeks between 18 February-21 April 1968, peaking at 2nd position.

References

1967 songs
French-language songs
Östen Warnerbring songs
Songs with music by Gilbert Bécaud